Ashwick House is the name of two houses in Somerset:

Ashwick Court  (Mendip district)
Ashwick House (near Dulverton)